Mimisal  is a coastal village in the Avadaiyarkoil revenue block of Pudukkottai district, Tamil Nadu, India.

Demographics 
At the 2011 census, Mimisal had a total population of 2,793 with 1,430 males and 1,363 females. Out of the total population, 2,026 people were literate.

References

Villages in Pudukkottai district